In telecommunication, a data transmission circuit is the transmission media and the intervening equipment used for the data transfer between data terminal equipment (DTEs).  

A data transmission circuit includes any required signal conversion equipment. 

A data transmission circuit may transfer information in (a) one direction only, (b) either direction but one way at a time, or (c) both directions simultaneously.  See duplex (telecommunications).

See also
 Telecommunication circuit

References

Data transmission